Oumare Tounkara (born 25 May 1990) is a French professional footballer who plays as a striker for US Créteil-Lusitanos' B-team.

Tounkara began his career at French club Sedan, before attracting transfer interest from Premier League club Sunderland. He signed for Sunderland in the summer of 2009. Tounkara had two loan spells at League One club Oldham Athletic, playing regularly during the 2010–11 season and also making eight appearances during shorter stay towards the latter stages of the 2011–12 season. He was released by Sunderland in May 2012, without making any first-team appearances. 

He briefly returned to France to join Red Star of the Championnat National, but again did not make any appearances. In March 2013, Tounkara joined League Two club Bristol Rovers on a short-term deal, and was released upon the expiry of his contract in May that year. Shortly after, he signed for League One club Stevenage, where he was also loaned out to Grimsby Town. He returned to France in the summer of 2014 and joined JA Drancy for the 2014–15 season. After a successful spell at Drancy, he joined Châteauroux, helping the club to achieve promotion to Ligue 2 during the 2016–17 season. After four years at Châteauroux, Tounkara signed for Romanian club Astra Giurgiu in July 2019. He returned to France and signed for Lyon La Duchère in June 2020, spending a year there before joining Fleury.

Early life
Tounkara was born in Paris to a Senegalese-Malian family, and is one of six children.

Club career

Sunderland

Tounkara signed a professional contract with French Ligue 2 club Sedan ahead of the 2008–09 season, although he did not make any first-team appearances during his twelve months with the club. He was invited for a trial at Premier League club Sunderland and subsequently joined the club on a permanent basis in July 2009 after playing in several of the reserve team's pre-season friendly fixtures. He struggled with persistent injuries during his first season at Sunderland, making 13 appearances for the reserves, although did not make any first-team appearances. 

Ahead of the 2010–11 season, Tounkara, along with team-mate Jean-Yves Mvoto, joined League One club Oldham Athletic on a season-long loan deal, in order to gain first-team experience. He made his debut for Oldham just two days after joining the club, on 7 August, playing the first 84 minutes of the game as Oldham opened the season with a 2–1 victory at Tranmere Rovers. A week later, Tounkara scored his first goal for the club, doubling the club's advantage in an eventual 3–0 win over Notts County at Boundary Park. Tounkara went on to score three goals in five games throughout late October and November 2010, all of which coming at Oldham's home ground, taking his goal tally to five for the season. In January 2011, Tounkara scored twice within the space of a week; firstly "crashing in a thumping drive" following a goalmouth scramble in Oldham's 2–0 away win at Plymouth Argyle, before scoring just before half-time in a 2–1 win over Brentford. He was a regular throughout his year at Oldham, scoring seven times in 46 appearances.

He returned to Sunderland at the end of the season, and trained with the first-team during pre-season ahead of the 2011–12 season, scoring in a 2–1 friendly victory over York City on 13 July 2011. He was handed a squad number for the season after impressing manager Steve Bruce in pre-season. Despite early signs indicating Tounkara could debut for the first-team during the season, he returned to playing for Sunderland's reserve team during the first half of the season. Tounkara stated — "I really enjoyed playing with the first-team and learned a lot of things from playing with the fantastic players Sunderland have. It has been difficult to get a chance when you have players like them around you. It was a good experience but disappointing I didn't get a chance after that". In March 2012, on emergency loan deadline day, Tounkara was again loaned to Oldham Athletic, this time on an agreement for the remainder of the 2011–12 season. On signing Tounkara for a second time, Oldham manager Paul Dickov said — "As we know from when he was here before he is a threat physically and also has pace". He made eight appearances, of which three were starting, scoring one goal on the last day of the season in a 2–1 victory over Carlisle United. On his return to Sunderland, he was one of nine players released by the club in May 2012, and did not make any first-team appearances during his three-year stay with the North East club.

Bristol Rovers
Following his release from Sunderland, Tounkara briefly returned to France to play for Red Star of the Championnat National, but made no first-team appearances during his time there. In February 2013, Tounkara joined League Two club Bristol Rovers on a week-long trial. The trial proved to be successful, and he signed for the club on a short-term contract until the end of the 2012–13 season. He made his debut for Bristol Rovers in the club's 3–0 win over Burton Albion on 2 March 2013, coming on as a substitute for Ryan Brunt on the hour mark. He scored twice for the club on Easter Monday, in a 4–2 away victory against Dagenham & Redbridge, in what was also his first starting appearance. After the match, manager John Ward praised Tounkara's performance — "He has also got a good awareness and showed he can finish as well so he is definitely an interesting player. He's only had bits and pieces of games since he has been here, but he has worked really hard in training. The lad came over from France without a Euro in his pocket a couple of months ago determined to carve out a career for himself. If he keeps that sort of form up it won't only be me looking to try and keep him". However, Tounkara was released by the club at the end of the season, with Ward stating the return to fitness of his other strikers meant the player would get limited game-time. He made nine appearances and scored twice during his brief time with Bristol Rovers.

Stevenage
Tounkara signed for League One club Stevenage on a free transfer on 21 May 2013. He made his debut for the club on the opening day of the 2013–14 season, playing the whole match as Stevenage lost 4–3 to one of Tounkara's former employers, Oldham Athletic. Tounkara played a peripheral role during the first half of the season, making seven starts and 10 further substitute appearances, and was subsequently made available for loan in January 2014.

Two weeks after being available for loan, Tounkara joined Conference Premier club Grimsby Town on 27 January 2014, on a loan deal for the remainder of the season. He made his debut a day after joining the club, coming on as an 83rd-minute substitute in Grimsby's 2–1 away victory at Cambridge United. Tounkara scored his first goal for Grimsby in his first start for the club in a 4–1 FA Trophy win over Tamworth on 1 February 2014. He went on to score two further times for Grimsby, both coming in games at Blundell Park in April 2014; firstly coming off the substitutes' bench to score a late equaliser against Woking, before scoring in a 2–1 win over Chester. During his time at Grimsby, Tounkara made 15 appearances in all competitions, of which six were starting, and scored three times.

Drancy
Tounkara was released by Stevenage in May 2014, and started the 2014–15 season without a club. He joined JA Drancy of the Championnat National 2, the fourth tier of the French football league system, in October 2014. He made his debut for Drancy on 19 October 2014, playing the opening 83 minutes in the club's 2–0 away victory at Metz II. Tounkara's arrival coincided with an upturn in form for the club, scoring five goals in his five opening games, to help take them out of the relegation places and into mid-table. His early season form at Drancy attracted the interest of Ligue 1 clubs Saint-Étienne and Toulouse respectively, although no move materialised, and he remained at Drancy to see out the 2014–15 season. Tounkara scored his first career hat-trick in a 3–1 win over Raon-l'Étape in March 2015. He ended the season having scored 11 goals in 19 appearances for the Parisien team, with Drancy finishing in ninth place in the league.

Châteauroux

Tounkara left Drancy at the end of the season, and subsequently joined Championnat National club LB Châteauroux on a free transfer ahead of the 2015–16 season. He made his Châteauroux debut in the club's opening game of the season, on 7 August 2015, playing the whole match in a 1–0 loss to Fréjus Saint-Raphaël. Tounkara scored his first goals for Châteauroux a month into the season, netting twice late-on in a 3–1 win against US Boulogne at Stade de la Libération on 4 September 2015. He was a regular for the club throughout the season and adapted well to making the step up into the third tier of French football, playing 29 games in all competitions and scoring 12 times during a season where Châteauroux narrowly missed out on promotion following a fifth-placed finish.

Tounkara remained at Châteauroux for the 2016–17 season and the season proved to be successful individually and collectively for both player and club. He opened the season by scoring in Châteauroux's first league match of the season, a 2–0 away win at Les Herbiers VF. He was a mainstay in the starting line-up for most of the season, starting 30 of the 34 league matches, and made two further substitute appearances, scoring seven times as Châteauroux won Championnat National, thus earning promotion into Ligue 2. At the end of the season, it was initially stated that Tounkara had left Châteauroux upon the expiry of his contract, amid interest from "many clubs". However, in June 2017, Châteauroux stated that Tounkara had signed a three-year contract to remain contracted to the club until 2020.

Tounkara started in the club's first game of the 2017–18 season, an away match at Stade Brest on 28 July 2017, although his Ligue 2 debut was marred after he sustained an injury in the ninth-minute and was consequently substituted. He returned to first-team action a month later, coming on as a late substitute in a 5–1 win at Sochaux, before scoring his first goal of the season in the club's next match, doubling Châteauroux's lead in an eventual 3–2 home win over US Quevilly on 8 September 2017. Tounkara scored six times in 34 appearances during the season, as Châteauroux consolidated their place in the second tier of French football by finishing in ninth position in Ligue 2. He scored four times in 32 appearances in all competitions during the 2018–19 season.

Astra Giurgiu
He spent the 2019–20 season with Romanian club Astra Giurgiu, having signed a contract on 26 July 2019. He made his debut in the club's 2–1 victory over FCSB on 5 August 2019, coming on as a 91st-minute substitute in the match. Tounkara was limited to just six starts during his time with Astra Giurgiu, making 15 appearances in all competitions.

Return to France
He returned to France and signed for Championnat National club SC Lyon on 1 June 2020, scoring four times in 24 appearances during the 2020–21 season as the club were relegated to Championnat National 2. Tounkara signed for Championnat National 2 club Fleury on 5 August 2021. He debuted for the club in a 2–1 away victory at Beauvais on 14 August 2021, coming on as a 78th-minute substitute in the match.

International career
Tounkara was named in the provisional squad for France's under-20 team for the 2011 Toulon Tournament, but was ultimately not selected in the final 20-man squad.

Career statistics

Honours
Châteauroux
Championnat National: 2016–17

References

External links

1990 births
Living people
Footballers from Paris
French footballers
Association football forwards
CS Sedan Ardennes players
Sunderland A.F.C. players
Oldham Athletic A.F.C. players
Red Star F.C. players
Bristol Rovers F.C. players
Stevenage F.C. players
Grimsby Town F.C. players
JA Drancy players
LB Châteauroux players
FC Astra Giurgiu players
Lyon La Duchère players
FC Fleury 91 players
English Football League players
National League (English football) players
Championnat National 2 players
Championnat National players
Ligue 2 players
Liga I players
French expatriate footballers
Expatriate footballers in England
Expatriate footballers in Romania
French expatriate sportspeople in England
French expatriate sportspeople in Romania
French people of Malian descent
French sportspeople of Senegalese descent